Zero Gravity II is a mixtape by American rapper Los, billed as King Los, released in 2014 on After Platinum Records.

Background
After parting ways with Bad Boy Records, Los began working on a sequel to his 2010 mixtape, Zero Gravity.  Los said that his outlook on the new year is namely to motivate, stating, "In 2014 I just intend to inspire a lot of people and motivate a lot of people. Success and all that it comes with the territory, we want plaques and all kinds of awards and stuff too, but at the same time, it's more important to inspire someone." The first track to leak off of the mixtape was "Play Too Rough", and months later came out with the music video of the song, "Woke Up Like This".

Track listing

References

2014 mixtape albums